North Toronto Christian School (NTCS) is a non-semestered private Christian school located in Toronto, Ontario, Canada. The school is a co-educational Christian elementary and high school, not affiliated with any specific church or denomination. Space is offered for both domestic and international students, along with an accompanying ESL and homestay program.

North Toronto Christian School is a member of the Association of Christian Schools International.

History
North Toronto Christian School was founded in 1981.

NTCS originally occupied the former Page Public School building, which was closed  as an operating school by the North York Board of Education (later Toronto District School Board) in 1981. Its first lease was for five years and was terminated on July 31, 2011. The Page Avenue property was sold to a private owner. Formerly called The Yorkland School, the high school adopted the elementary school's name, North Toronto Christian School, during a merger between the two schools at the beginning of the 2011/2012 school year.

From March 13, 2020 to the end of the 2019–2020 school year, the school building was closed due to the COVID-19 pandemic. The school used online learning during that time.

Property
North Toronto Christian School is situated on a  campus near the intersection of Highway 401 and Highway 404 in North York, an area of Toronto. Evidence of the building's past can still be seen in some areas throughout the building.  

High school classrooms are numbered N1-N6, C1-C8, and S1 (N for North, C for Central Square, and S for South).   

There is a music classroom in room N6, and science classrooms in rooms N3-N5. 

In 2010–2011, the building was renovated and expanded in order to accommodate elementary school students and staff. The elementary school building, which was rented from the Toronto District School Board, was demolished in 2011, as the property was sold by the TDSB to a property developer.

Technology 

There are three computer labs with Internet access in rooms C4, C6, and C8. All computers in the computer labs run on Windows 10 Home and have Microsoft Office 2007 and LibreOffice installed, along with tools for programming. There is no student Wi-Fi connectivity and students may use their cell phones only outside the school building or in the main office. There are no student libraries, however, the Toronto Public Library's Fairview branch is 1.5 km away.

Daily schedule
The school day at North Toronto Christian School begins at 9:00 a.m. The high school day ends at 3:30 p.m., whilst the elementary school day ends at 3:15 p.m. Uniforms are required. Chapel is usually held every other Wednesday after period one for the high school students, and after homeroom for the grade 7 to 9 students. Schedule days are numbered Day 1–4, with 6 periods of 50 minutes in length each day, as well as a 40-minute lunch break between period 3 and 4, 10-minute homeroom time (where announcements are read out and devotions are done) between period 2 and 3, and a 5-minute gap between other periods. Grades 11-12 also have spare periods; they may leave the school or work in the café area on the first floor during these periods.

Athletic facilities
Many of the fitness facilities, such as the swimming pool, track, and squash courts, are remnants of the school's past as a fitness centre.

Indoor swimming pool
Three squash courts
Two indoor half basketball courts
Soccer field
Indoor track
Weight training area
Aerobic area
Playground
Outdoor Basketball/ball hockey court

Extracurricular activities
Sports teams include volleyball, soccer, basketball, swimming and more. These sports teams are available to both the junior grades and the senior grades. There are other teams such as the DECA team and a service and leadership team (SALT), and the school's Reach for the Top team which qualified for the Ontario provincial finals in the 2018–2019 school year.

Chandos Outdoor Education Centre
Chandos Outdoor Education Centre is a camp property owned and operated by North Toronto Christian School.  Twice a year, students from grades 3 - 9 take an overnight trip there, in the fall and in the winter. Once a year, students in grade 10 take an overnight trip there, in the fall. Each class, accompanied by teachers (and parents for younger grades), goes once in the fall and once in the winter. 
Chandos Outdoor Education Centre is located outside of Apsley, Ontario, on Chandos Lake. In the summer, a summer camp, Camp Ke-Mon-Oya, is operated there.

Notable alumni

 Stefanie Reid: Paralympian
Arda Zakarian: General News Anchor, CP24
Jordan Romano: Pitcher, Toronto Blue Jays

References

External links
 

Elementary schools in Toronto
Middle schools in Toronto
High schools in Toronto
Educational institutions established in 1981
1981 establishments in Ontario